The Avro 679 Manchester was a British twin-engine heavy bomber developed and manufactured by the Avro aircraft company in the United Kingdom. While not being built in great numbers, it was the forerunner of the famed and vastly more successful four-engined Avro Lancaster, which was one of the most capable strategic bombers of the Second World War.

Avro designed the Manchester in conformance with the requirements laid out by the British Air Ministry Specification P.13/36, which sought a capable medium bomber with which to equip the Royal Air Force (RAF) and to replace its inventory of twin-engine bombers, such as the Armstrong Whitworth Whitley, Handley Page Hampden and Vickers Wellington. Performing its maiden flight on 25 July 1939, the Manchester entered squadron service in November 1940, just over twelve months after the outbreak of the war.

Operated by both RAF and the Royal Canadian Air Force (RCAF), the Manchester came to be regarded as an operational failure, primarily as a result of its Rolls-Royce Vulture engines, which were underdeveloped and hence underpowered and unreliable, and production was terminated in 1941. However, the Manchester was redesigned into a four-engined heavy bomber, powered by the Rolls-Royce Merlin engine instead, which became known as the Lancaster.

Development
The Manchester has its origins in a design produced by Avro in order to fulfil the British Air Ministry's Specification P.13/36. This was the same specification to which Handley Page had also produced their initial design for what would become the Halifax bomber. Issued in May 1936, Specification P.13/36 called for a twin-engine monoplane "medium bomber" for "worldwide use", which was to be capable of carrying out shallow (30°) dive bombing attacks and carry heavy bombloads (8,000 lb/3,630 kg) or two 18 in (457 mm) torpedoes. Additionally, it had to feature provisions to conduct catapult assisted takeoffs, which would permit the carriage of the maximum payload, was also a stated requirement, although this provision was explicitly removed in July 1938. The envisioned cruising speed of the bomber was to be a minimum of 275 mph at 15,000 feet. The Air Ministry had expectations for an aircraft of similar weight to the B.1/35 specification, but smaller and faster.

Avro had already started work on a corresponding design prior to having received a formal invitation to tender. The company was in competition with Boulton Paul, Bristol, Fairey, Handley Page and Shorts. Vickers also had its Warwick, which had Napier Sabre engines, but eventually chose against tendering it. In early 1937, both the Avro design and the rival Handley Page HP.56 were accepted and prototypes of both ordered; but in mid-1937, the Air Ministry exercised their rights to order the types "off the drawing board". This skipping of the usual process was necessary due to the initiation of a wider expansion of the RAF in expectation of large scale war in Europe. From 1939, it was expected that the P.13/36 would begin replacing the RAF's existing medium bombers, such as the Armstrong Whitworth Whitley, Handley Page Hampden and Vickers Wellington.

The Avro design used the Rolls-Royce Vulture 24-cylinder X-block engine, which was two Rolls-Royce Peregrine Vee cylinder blocks mounted one on top of the other, the bottom one inverted to give the "X" shape. When developed in 1935, the Vulture engine had promise — it was rated at 1,760 hp (1,310 kW) but it proved woefully unreliable and had to be derated to 1,480–1,500 hp (1,100–1,120 kW). Avro's prototype Manchester L7246, was assembled by their experimental department at Manchester's Ringway Airport and first flew from there on 25 July 1939, with the second aircraft following on 26 May 1940. The Vulture engine was chosen by Avro and not stipulated by the Air Ministry as is sometimes claimed; other engine layouts considered included the use of two Bristol Hercules or Bristol Centaurus radial engines. The Handley Page HP.56, always intended as the backup to the Avro, was redesigned to take four engines on the orders of the Air Ministry in 1937, when the Vulture was already showing problems.

While the Manchester was designed with a twin tail, the first production aircraft, designated the Mk I, had a central fin added and twenty aircraft like this were built. They were succeeded by the Mk IA which reverted to the twin-fin system but used enlarged, taller fin and rudders mounted on a new tailplane, with span increased from 22 ft (6.71 m) to 33 ft (10.06 m). This configuration was carried over to the Lancaster, except for the first prototype, which also used a central fin and was a converted, unfinished Manchester. Avro constructed 177 Manchesters while Metropolitan-Vickers completed 32 aircraft. Plans for Armstrong Whitworth and Fairey Aviation at  Ringway (now Manchester Airport) to build the Manchester were abandoned. Fairey's order for 150 Manchesters was replaced by orders for the Halifax.

Design

The Avro Manchester was designed with great consideration for ease of manufacture and repair. The fuselage of the aircraft comprised longitudinal stringers or longerons throughout, over which an external skin of aluminium alloy was flush-riveted for a smooth external surface. The wings were of a two-spar construction, the internal ribs being made of aluminium alloys; fuel was contained with several self-sealing fuel tanks within the wings. The tail shared a similar construction to the wing, featuring a twin fin-and-rudder configuration that provided good vision for the dorsal gunner.

The cockpit housed the pilot and fighting controller's position underneath the canopy, and these two crew members were provided with all-round vision. The navigator was seated aft of the fighting controller and the position included an astrodome for use of a sextant. The bomb aimer's station was housed inside the aircraft's nose, beneath the forward turret and bomb aiming was conducted using optical sights housed in this compartment. For crew comfort on lengthy missions, a rest area was situated just to the rear of the main cabin.

The aircraft's undercarriage was entirely retractable via hydraulic systems, or in an emergency, a backup air system. The doors to the bomb bay were also operated by these systems, an additional safety measure was installed to ensure that the bombs could not be dropped if the doors were shut. The bombs were housed on bomb racks inside the internal bomb bay, and other armaments such as torpedoes could also be fitted. All fuel tankage was located in the wings in order to keep the fuselage free to accommodate more armaments in the bomb bay which covered nearly two-thirds of the underside of the fuselage.

Vulnerable parts of the aircraft were armoured; the pilot had additional armour and bulletproof glass and an armoured bulkhead was to the rear of the navigator's position. The Manchester featured three hydraulically-operated turrets, located in the nose, rear and mid-upper fuselage; the addition of a ventral turret directly behind the bomb bay had been considered and tested on the second prototype, but did not feature on production aircraft. Access to all crew stations was provided by a walkway and crew positions had nearby escape hatches.

The Manchester was powered by a pair of Vulture engines; in service these proved to be extremely unreliable. Aviation author Jon Lake stated of the Vulture: "The engine made the Manchester mainly notable for its unreliability, poor performance, and general inadequacy to the task at hand" and attributed the aircraft's poor service record to the engine troubles.

I was one of the six original pilots to have flown with the first Manchester squadron. That was a disaster. The aircraft itself, the airframe, had many shortcomings in equipment in the beginning, but as we found out Avro were excellent in doing modifications and re-equipping the aeroplane. The engines never were and never did become reliable. They did not give enough power for the aeroplane, so we ended up with two extremely unreliable 1,750 hp engines having to haul a 50,000-pound aircraft. We should really have had 2,500 hp engines. You felt that if you'd lost one, that was it, you weren't coming home. It didn't matter if you feathered the propeller or not. There was only one way you went and that was down. I have seen an aircraft doing a run up on the ground and have two pistons come right out through the side of the engine. The original bearings were made without any silver as an economy measure, so they weren't hard enough. The bearings would collapse the connecting rod and the piston would fling out through the side of the engine and bang! Your engine just destroyed itself.

Operational history

On 5 August 1940, the first production Avro Manchester, L7276, was delivered to RAF Boscombe Down in advance of service acceptance trials. In November 1940, the Manchester officially entered service with the newly reformed No. 207 Squadron of RAF Bomber Command. The type passed all acceptance tests by 21 December 1940, and 207 Squadron had at least 80 Manchesters on strength by the end of 1940. The Manchester's first operational mission was conducted on 24–25 February 1941 in a raid on the French port of Brest. On 13 March 1941, L7319 became the first Manchester to be shot down by enemy fire.

On 13 April 1941, all Manchesters were temporarily grounded due to a higher than expected number of engine bearing failures; on 16 June 1941, a second grounding of the type was ordered due to more engine troubles. The unserviceability of the Vulture engine forced squadrons to make use of obsolete bombers such as the Hampden in its place. Upon the restart of operations in August 1941, additional failings were encountered; excessive tail flutter, hydraulic failures and faulty propeller feathering controls. Production of the Manchester was halted in November 1941, by which point a total of 202 aircraft had been constructed. A total of eight bomber squadrons were equipped with the type, it also served in two further squadrons and  also saw use by RAF Coastal Command.

While modifications were made by Avro to address some of the technical issues experienced, unit strength suffered and Bomber Command was frequently unable to raise significant numbers of aircraft to participate in large bombing missions; on 7 November 1941, all of the RAFs serviceable bombers had been dispatched to bomb Berlin, out of a force of over 400 bombers, only 15 were Manchesters. On 3 March 1942, out of a force of nearly 200 bombers sent against a Renault factory near Paris, 25 were Manchesters; while during the first 1,000 bomber raid on Cologne on 30 May 1942, 35 Manchesters were amongst the 1,047 bombers sent to attack the city. Flying Officer Leslie Manser was posthumously awarded the Victoria Cross for his actions while piloting Manchester L7301 of 50 Squadron during the Cologne bombing mission.

The Mk III Manchester (serial number BT308) which first flew on 9 January 1941, was essentially the first Lancaster, featuring a longer wing fitted with four Rolls-Royce Merlins in new unitized, power-egg nacelles – originally developed by Rolls-Royce for the Merlin-powered Beaufighter II – although initially retaining the three fins and twin outboard rudders (the central fin had no movable control surface) of the Manchester I. BT308 received the "Lancaster" name immediately after its first flight. The second prototype Lancaster DG595 featured the twin, enlarged fins and rudders of the Manchester IA. Manchester production continued until November of that year but some aircraft that were still in production were instead completed as Lancasters.

The 193 operational Manchesters flew 1,269 sorties with Bomber Command, dropping 1,826 tons (1,657 tonnes) of bombs and lost 78 aircraft in action, flying its last operation against Bremen on 25 June 1942. A further 45 were non-operational losses of which 30 involved engine failure. The Manchester was withdrawn from operations in mid-1942 in favour of more capable aircraft. Its final role in RAF service was as instructional trainers for converting crews to the RAF's new Lancaster bombers; the Manchester and Lancaster shared nearly identical crew positions and fuselages. The type persisted in use for training purposes into 1943 before being completely retired.

Variants
Manchester L7246
First prototype originally with twin tail. Due to lack of directional stability, it had a third fin added. Became a training airframe in November 1942.
Manchester L7247
Second prototype first flown 26 May 1940, fitted with armament, became a training airframe in October 1941.
Manchester I
First production version with 90 ft wing and 28 ft twin tail and additional central fin later added; 20 of this type were built.
Manchester IA
Main production version with 90 ft wing, twin tail with 33 ft enlarged tailplane. It also had taller fins and rudders.
Manchester IB
As Manchester IA but with thin-gauge fuselage skin.
Manchester IC
As Manchester IB but with 2 x 2,520 hp Bristol Centaurus. Installed in one airframe but never flown.
Manchester II
As Manchester IB but with 95 ft wing.
Manchester IIA
As Manchester II but with 2 x Bristol Centaurus. None built.
Manchester III BT308
This version was powered by four Merlin engines with increased wingspan; also, the three fins and rudders of the Manchester I were retained. This variant was the first prototype of the later Avro Lancaster.

Orders and production
 Two prototypes were ordered against specification P.13/36 and were built by Avro at Ringway.
 Production contract for 200 Manchesters placed with Avro to be built at Chadderton, contract changed to Lancaster I production after 157 had been built, delivered between August 1940 and November 1941.
 Production contract for 150 Manchesters placed with Fairey to be built at Ringway, order cancelled.
 Production contract for 200 Manchesters placed with Metropolitan-Vickers at Trafford Park, contract changed to Lancaster I production after 43 had been built, delivered between March 1941 and March 1942. The first 12 aircraft being built on the Trafford Park production line were destroyed in a German air raid on 23 December 1940, not being completed they are not included in the total aircraft built.
 Production contract for 150 Manchesters placed with Armstrong-Whitworth, order cancelled.
In total two prototypes and 200 production aircraft were built before the production lines changed to building the four-engine Lancaster.

Operators

 Royal Australian Air Force
 No. 460 Squadron RAAF (August 1942 - October 1942) 

 Royal Canadian Air Force
 No. 408 Squadron RCAF
 No. 420 Squadron RCAF

 Royal Air Force
 No. 49 Squadron RAF at RAF Scampton (April 1942 – June 1942)
 No. 50 Squadron RAF at RAF Skellingthorpe (April 1942 – June 1942)
 No. 61 Squadron RAF at RAF Hemswell (June 1941 – June 1942)
 No. 83 Squadron RAF at RAF Scampton (December 1941 – June 1942)
 No. 97 Squadron RAF at RAF Waddington then RAF Coningsby (February 1941 – February 1942)
 No. 106 Squadron RAF at RAF Coningsby (February 1942 – June 1942)
 No. 207 Squadron RAF at RAF Waddington then RAF Bottesford (November 1940 – March 1942)
 No. 25 Operation Training Unit at RAF Finningley
 No. 44 Conversion Flight
 No. 1485 Flight RAF
 No. 1654 Heavy Conversion Unit
 No. 1656 Heavy Conversion Unit
 No. 1660 Heavy Conversion Unit
 No. 1668 Heavy Conversion Unit
 Airborne Forces Experimental Establishment
 Torpedo Development Unit at RAF Gosport

Specifications (Manchester Mk I)

See also

References

Notes

Citations

Bibliography

 "Avro Manchester – Details and Performance of Our Heaviest Twin-engined Bomber." Flight International, 4 June 1942. pp. 555–557.
 Bowyer, Chaz. Aircraft Profile No. 260: Avro Manchester. Windsor, UK: Profile Publications, 1974.
 Buttler, Tony. British Secret Projects: Fighters and Bombers 1935–1950. Hickley, UK: Midland Publishing, 2004. .
 Jackson, A.J. Avro Aircraft since 1908. London: Putnam Aeronautical Books, Second edition, 1990. .
 Lake, Jon. The Great Book of Bombers: The World's Most Important Bombers from World War I to the Present Day. Zenith Imprint, 2002. .
 Lewis, Peter. The British Bomber since 1914. London: Putnam, Second edition, 1974. .
 "Manchesters". Aeromilitaria No. 2.  Tonbridge, Kent, UK: Air-Britain (Historians) Ltd., 1990.
 Mason, Francis K. The British Bomber since 1914. London: Putnam Aeronautical Books, 1994. .
 Sinnott, Colin. The RAF and Aircraft Design 1923–1939: Air Staff Operational Requirements (Studies in Air Power). London: Frank Cass, 2001. .
 Thetford, Owen. Aircraft of the Royal Air Force 1918–57. London: Putnam, First edition, 1957. .

Further reading

 Chant, Christopher. Lancaster: The History of Britain's Most Famous World War II Bomber. Bath, UK: Parragon, 2003. .
 Holmes, Harry. Avro: The History of an Aircraft Company. Marlborough, UK: Crowood Press Ltd, Second edition, 2004. .
 Holmes, Harry. Avro Lancaster (Combat Legend series). Shrewsbury, UK: Airlife Publishing Ltd., 2002. .
 Jackson, Robert. Aircraft of World War II. Enderby, UK: Silverdale Books, 2006. .
 Kirby, Robert. Avro Manchester: The Legend Behind the Manchester. Leicester, UK: Midland Publishing, 1995. .
 Mackay, R.S.G. Lancaster in action. Carrollton, Texas: Squadron/Signal Publications Inc., 1982. .

External links

 Royal Air Force Bomber Command 60th Anniversary – Avro Manchester
 History, Specifications and Pictures of the Avro Manchester
 The Lancaster & Manchester Bomber Archive
 1941 British Pathe news report on the newly introduced Avro Manchester
 "Avro Manchester" a 1942 Flight article

Conventional landing gear
Manchester
1930s British bomber aircraft
World War II British bombers
Twin piston-engined tractor aircraft
Aircraft first flown in 1939
Twin-tail aircraft